Ctenocladus is a genus of green algae in the order Ulvales.

References

External links

Ulvophyceae genera
Ulvales